The Cooper T88 was an open-wheel formula racing car, designed, developed and built by British manufacturer and constructor Cooper, for the SCCA's Formula C category, in 1968. It was closely based on the Cooper T86 Formula One car. It was colloquially referred to as the Cooper-BRM, due to the  BRM four-cylinder engine that powered it. Rehl finished the 1968 season in fourth place, scoring 24 points.

References

External links 

Cooper racing cars  
Open wheel racing cars